Basirhat is a city in India. It may also refer to:

Basirhat subdivision, an administrative division in North 24 Parganas district in the Indian state of West Bengal
Basirhat I, a community development block in North 24 Parganas district in the Indian state of West Bengal
Basirhat II, a community development block in North 24 Parganas district in the Indian state of West Bengal
Basirhat (Lok Sabha constituency), a parliamentary constituency in North 24 Parganas district in the Indian state of West Bengal
Basirhat Dakshin, an assembly constituency in North 24 Parganas district in the Indian state of West Bengal
Basirhat Uttar, an assembly constituency in North 24 Parganas district in the Indian state of West Bengal
Basirhat College, a degree college in Bsirhat